The discography of Rogério Skylab, a Brazilian experimental singer, currently consists of 24 studio albums (19 solo and five collaborations), one extended play, four live albums, three video albums, one compilation album and 14 singles. His 1992 debut, Fora da Grei, was financed thanks to a money prize he won in a music festival the year prior, and since then, nearly all of his subsequent albums were self-released or came out through independent labels.

Albums

Studio albums

Extended plays

Live/video albums

Collaborative albums

Compilation albums

Music videos

Singles

References

Discographies of Brazilian artists
Latin music discographies
Rock music discographies